DeBartolo is a surname. Notable people with the surname include:
Anthony DeBartolo, writer for The Chicago Tribune and other publications
Denise DeBartolo York, current owner of the San Francisco 49ers, sister of Ed DeBartolo Jr.
Dick DeBartolo, writer for Mad Magazine
Edward J. DeBartolo Sr., developer of shopping centers
Edward J. DeBartolo Jr., former owner of the San Francisco 49ers football team, son of Edward J. DeBartolo Sr.
Gavin DeBartolo, Australian rugby player
Tiffanie DeBartolo, American novelist, daughter of Edward J. DeBartolo Jr.